Alexander Joseph McRae (1844–1888) was an Australian explorer, pastoralist and businessman. McRae was notable as an early settler in north-west Western Australia. In 1882 McRae found gold between Cossack and Roebourne, with one nugget weighing upwards of 9 dwt (14g).

The McRae River is named after him.

Footnotes

Bibliography
 Ballarat & District Genealogical Society, ‘Duncan McRae 1804–1889 & Janet McRae c1818–1899’, 2009 <https://web.archive.org/web/20110219115325/http://www.ballaratgenealogy.org.au/digby/family/mcrae_dun.htm> [Retrieved: June 5, 2009] 
 Traditional Owners – Millstream Park Council, Department of Environment and Conservation & Conservation Commission of Western Australia, Millstream-Chichester National Park and Mungaroona Range Nature Reserve Draft Management Plan 2007, Perth WA, Department of Environment and Conservation, 2007.

1844 births
1888 deaths
Settlers of Western Australia
Place of birth missing